The Smart-Maynilad Net Spikers was a professional women's volleyball club playing in the Shakey's V-League. The team is owned by Smart Communications and Maynilad Water Services.

Current roster 

Coaching staff
 Head Coach:
Roger Gorayeb

Honors

Team

Individual

References 

Volleyball